(On Hold) is the second solo studio album of Turkish pop singer İzel. This was also the first album in which Turkish pop singer Mustafa Sandal served as music director.

Track listing
 Emanet, 1997
"Emanet" (featuring Mustafa Sandal)  – 4:57
"Eyvallah"  – 
"Geyik Çıkabilir" – 
"Bekle Biraz"  – 
"Sır" – 
"Deli Gibi"  – 
"Acilen"  – 
"Nakış"  – 
"Hain"  – 
"Kızımız Olacaktı"  –

Credits
 Music direction, arrangements: İzel, Mustafa Sandal
 Mixing: İzel, Mustafa Sandal
 Publisher: Raks Müzik
 Photography: Raks Müzik

Music videos

Notes 

İzel Çeliköz albums
1997 albums